Urho Korhonen (14 June 1907 – 23 May 1971) was a Finnish gymnast. He competed in seven events at the 1928 Summer Olympics.

References

1907 births
1971 deaths
Finnish male artistic gymnasts
Olympic gymnasts of Finland
Gymnasts at the 1928 Summer Olympics
Sportspeople from Vyborg
20th-century Finnish people